Cambarus tartarus, the Oklahoma cave crayfish, is a species of crayfish in the family Cambaridae. It is endemic to two caves in Delaware County, Oklahoma in the United States.

The IUCN conservation status of Cambarus tartarus is "CR", critically endangered. The species faces an extremely high risk of extinction in the immediate future. The IUCN status was reviewed in 2010.

References

Further reading

 
 
 

Cambaridae
Cave crayfish
Articles created by Qbugbot
Crustaceans described in 1972
Taxa named by Horton H. Hobbs Jr.
Endemic fauna of Oklahoma